The Catalan basketball championship (Campionat de Catalunya) was a basketball competition in Catalonia and the first basketball league in Spain before the Liga Nacional was established in 1957.

The championship was used as a qualifier for the Copa del Rey.

History

Titles by team

External links
Catalan Basketball Federation

References
Achievements of FC Barcelona Bàsquet
Achievements of CE Laietà
History of catalan basketball
Fundació del basquet català

Basketball in Catalonia
Basketball competitions in Spain